Patriomanis ("father of pangolins") is an extinct genus of pangolin from extinct family Patriomanidae. It lived during the Eocene of North America and it currently represents the only pangolin known from the Western Hemisphere. The genus contains one species, P. americana, which is known from six specimens, mostly from the Chadronian White River Formation of Montana. It had long digits and a prehensile tail, suggesting that it was arboreal, and its jaw was capable of opening wider than modern pangolins. Its ears and the hair between its scales were also longer than modern pangolins.

Phylogeny 
Phylogenetic position of genus Patriomanis within family Patriomanidae.

References

Prehistoric pangolins
Eocene mammals
Myrmecophagous mammals
Prehistoric placental genera
Fossil taxa described in 1970
Prehistoric mammals of North America